The 1960 Virginia Cavaliers football team represented the University of Virginia during the 1960 NCAA University Division football season. The Cavaliers were led by third-year head coach Dick Voris and played their home games at Scott Stadium in Charlottesville, Virginia. They competed as members of the Atlantic Coast Conference, finishing in last. Virginia finished without a win for the second consecutive year and extended their losing streak to 28 games, tying the NCAA record set between 1945 and 1948 by the Kansas State Wildcats. Voris, who managed just one win in three seasons at Virginia, resigned as head coach at the end of the season.

Schedule

References

Virginia
Virginia Cavaliers football seasons
College football winless seasons
Virginia Cavaliers football